There is no chronological order in the Torah (Hebrew: אין מוקדם ומאוחר בתורה, literally "There is no early and late in the Torah") is an expression used by many Bible commentators when they encounter events which are out of chronological order. In rabbinic analysis, the issue of chronological order is related to the issue of semichut parshiyot (whether one can learn from one section of the Biblical text about another section which is adjacent to it).

Sources
Seemingly, the expression was first used in the Baraita on the Thirty-two Rules, which is traditionally attributed to Eliezer ben Jose (a 2nd-century tanna). However, according to modern scholar Moshe Zucker, this work was in fact only written in the 10th century.

The term first appears in the Mekhilta of Rabbi Ishmael, and also in the Mekhilta of Rabbi Shimon, Sifre on Numbers, and the Jerusalem Talmud.

The Babylonian Talmud proves that "There is no chronological order in the Torah" from the fact that Numbers 9:1 occurred on the first day of Nisan, while the earlier verse Numbers 1:1 occurred on the first day of Iyyar, a month later. In the ensuing discussion, Rav Pappa limits the application of the rule to cases of different matter, but within a single topic he says the Torah's narrative must be chronological. Later commentators disagree over the definition of a "matter": Rashi defines it as a parashah, while Rabbeinu Hananel defines it as a single topic of discussion.

The first Bible commentator to use the term was Rashi, who used it frequently, as did Ibn Ezra and the Torah Temimah. In contrast, Nachmanides argued that the Torah's order is generally chronological. Raavan argued that the principle only applies in the Torah, and not in the Nevi'im or Ketuvim.

Examples
The commandments in Leviticus 25 are stated as being given to Moses "on Mount Sinai", seemingly earlier in time than the ritual commandments of Leviticus chapters 1–24. Ibn Ezra explains that Leviticus 25 was indeed given before the ritual commandments, but was recorded later due to its thematic connection to the passages around it (Leviticus 18 and 26). In contrast, Nachmanides asserts that the passage is in chronological order, as only at this point did Moses relay to the people the commands he had previously been given on Mount Sinai.

References

Jewish theology